The 1980 United States presidential election in Georgia took place on November 4, 1980, in Georgia as part of the 1980 United States presidential election.

The Democratic Party candidate, incumbent President Jimmy Carter, won his home state of Georgia over former California Governor Ronald Reagan by 238,565 votes, one of just seven victories in the election (other than Georgia, Carter also carried Maryland, Minnesota, Hawaii, West Virginia, the District of Columbia and Rhode Island).

Georgia weighed in as 25 points more Democratic than the national average: slightly down from 1976, when the Peach State was 32 points more Democratic than the nation at large. Just four years later, Georgia would flip back to Republican territory and vote Republican in every election since except for the narrow victories of Bill Clinton in 1992 and Joe Biden in 2020. , this is the last election in which the counties of McDuffie, Towns, Gilmer, Whitfield, Union, Rabun, Stephens, Jackson, Banks, Murray, Habersham, Madison, Hall, White, Dawson, Gordon, Paulding, Spalding, Troup, Forsyth, Upson, Coweta, Effingham, Glascock, Bulloch, Houston, Bartow, Oconee, Glynn, Cherokee, Toombs, Thomas, Floyd, Colquitt, Camden, Echols, Charlton, Pierce, Coffee, Bryan, Walton, Oglethorpe, Evans, Tattnall, Tift, Pike, Harris, Carroll, Appling, Barrow, and Wayne voted for a Democratic presidential candidate. It is also the last occasion Ware County gave a majority to a Democratic presidential candidate, although Bill Clinton and incumbent president George H. W. Bush tied there with 4,573 votes in 1992. This is also the last time a Democrat won Georgia by a double-digit margin, the last time that a Republican won the presidency without carrying Georgia, and the last time a Democrat won a majority of the vote in Georgia.

Primaries

General election

Results by county

References

Georgia
1980
1980 Georgia (U.S. state) elections